The following is a list of Grammy Awards winners and nominees from Nigeria:

Notes

References
 
Nigerian
 Grammy
Grammy